Assumption College Thonburi is a private Catholic school located in Bangkok, Thailand. It is the eighth private school founded by the St. Gabriel Foundation in Thailand. The school was founded by Bro. John Mary Jesus Salas Esquiroz of the Saint Gabriel foundation in 1961.

The school provides education to students from grade 1 through 12 (K-12).

Logo
The logo has white and red stripes and is in the shape of a shield and the acronym word "ACT" features in blue and is at the centre of the school's crest.

It bears the inscription "1961 A.D." underneath to signify the year of the foundation of the school.

History 
The brothers of Saint Gabriel proposed the building of a school in Thonburi, Bangkok as a school that had been built prior to this could no longer accommodate the growing numbers of students.
 1961: Br. Angel Infante (อาซีเนียว อานเกล อินฟานเต) became the first chancellor with Bro. Martin Prateep Komonmart (ประทีป โคมลมาศ) becoming the first headmaster. Upon opening the school catered for grades 1 to 9.
 1963: setting up of a music class with many of its students graduating and proceeding to the Trinity College of Music, London University at Chulalonglorn University. 
 1966: the ACT Music Band won a singing competition and was awarded the certificate from Princess Maha Chakri Sirindhorn (ศาสตราจารย์กิตติมศักดิ์ ดอกเตอร์ พลเอกหญิง พลเรือเอกหญิง พลอากาศเอกหญิง สมเด็จพระเทพรัตนราชสุดา เจ้าฟ้ามหาจักรีสิรินธร รัฐสีมาคุณากรปิยชาติ สยามบรมราชกุมารี).
 12 July 1971: first sports competition between Assumption College Thonburi and St. Gabriel's School. From 1972 to 1995 the school underwent major modification and development. 
 1994: Assumption College Thonburi joined forces with the UK's Bell Education Trust.
 2002: the National Library of Thailand awarded the school a prize for excellence for the school library. Today the library has approximately 3,000 books. The football team was appointed Agent of Asia to join  "Manchester United Premier cup 2003 World Final" at Oregon. In the competition the team came 5th out of 20. ACT participated in environmental projects in conjunction with the Knoten Welmar Institute of Germany.
 2004: Assumption College Thonburi opened its "English Program."
 2009: Girls were admitted to the school for the first time.
 February 2012: Assumption College Thonburi's "English Program" signed a contract with the University of Oregon whereby presumptive teachers are sent to be trained at the university's campus in Oregon, United States annually, at the start and end of each academic year.
 2012–present: the current school director cum principal is Bro. Dr. Weerayut Bunpram, f.s.g. (ภาดา ดร. วีระยุทธ บุญพราหมณ์)
 2014: students of Grade 11 in ACT English Programme updated the Wikipedia page of ACT as their year-long project.

Founder 
 Bro. John Mary Jesus Salas Esquiroz was the founder of Assumption College Thonburi, Bangkok. Born on 26 December 1914 in Tafalia Naverra, Spain, he came to Thailand on 6 February 1936. He became director of St. Louis School in 1953. Subsequently, he became the director of St. Gabriel School in 1960.
 In 1955, he became the chancellor of Assumption College Thonburi School. He built and set up many schools such as, Assumption College Thonburi, Assumption Lumpang and Assumption Laylong. He was also involved in the building of the students' and teachers' dispensary at Assumption College Sriracha.

Main buildings 
Assumption College Thonburi has 17 buildings, six of which are used for academic purposes.
 Ratanabunnakarn Building is a learning building and was named by Princess Maha Chakri Sirindhorn (ศาสตราจารย์กิตติมศักดิ์ ดอกเตอร์ พลเอกหญิง พลเรือเอกหญิง พลอากาศเอกหญิง สมเด็จพระเทพรัตนราชสุดา เจ้าฟ้ามหาจักรีสิรินธร รัฐสีมาคุณากรปิยชาติ สยามบรมราชกุมารี). It houses rooms such as the Tawee Punya Library Ratanabunnakarn, the director's residence, audiovisual aids rooms amongst others.
 The Louis Mary Building was constructed in honour of St. Louis-Marie Grignion de Monfort, the founder of the Monfort Brothers of St. Gabriel. It is a multi-purpose building whose upper floors are used for exhibitions, conferences or the playing of indoor sports. The ground floor is home to the ACT Music Center.
 The Assumption Building was built to mark the ACT's 30th anniversary celebrations and is home to grades 5 to 8.
 The Raphael Building was built to honour Brother Pakde Tummakanon and houses grades 1 to 4.
 The TerdTepparat 36 building was built to mark the occasion of the 36th birthday of Princess Maha Chakri Sirindhorn in 1991. It contains an Olympic-sized pool and a 25-metre training pool. ACT's sports facilities are also kept here. The school's First aid room and canteen are also located here.
 The St. Gabriel Building was originally called the Science Building but its function was changed as the school's student numbers increased. The school has since constructed a dedicated science building. 
 The John Mary Building was built to mark the contribution to school of Bro. John Mary who was the founder of Assumption College Thonburi.
 The St. Marie Building was originally named the Saint Louis building but the name was changed during the time of Brother Lerchai Lavasud. 
 The St. Martin Building is home to dormitories and it accommodates the sport students during camps.
 St. Andrew's Building is the residence of foreign teachers and was named to honour Brother Andrew Arrom, a former chancellor of Assumption College Thonburi.
 The Golden Jubilee houses the ACT Fitness Centre and gymnasium. It is used for dancing room, tennis, golf, taekwondo, and yoga. The ground floor has a large canteen for ACT students and teachers. Its third floor is a conference centre.

Oregon & ACT 
Assumption College Thonburi English Program has a contract with the University of Oregon whereby students of one institution study in the other for a semester. There is a one-month school visit each year by students of the two facilities.

Qualification requirements for exchange students 
The students must have a clean behaviour record and be capable of speaking English. They must have a GPA of 2.5 or above.
Where students wish to continue the education in the University of Oregon they need to have a GPA of 3 or above.

Famous alumni

Athletes 
Theerathon Bunmathan – Football player
Teerasil Dangda – Football player
Kawin Thamsatchanan – Football player

References

External links 
 Assumption College Thonburi

Catholic schools in Thailand
Schools in Bangkok
Educational institutions established in 1961
1961 establishments in Thailand
Brothers of Christian Instruction of St Gabriel schools
Bang Khae district